Chinese Idol may refer to:

Arts, entertainment, and media
Chinese Idol Singer
Chinese Idol TV Series